1000 Palms is the third studio album by Floridian surf rock band Surfer Blood. It was released on May 12, 2015, under Joyful Noise Recordings.

Track listing

Personnel 
 John Paul Pitts – vocals, guitar, producer
 Thomas Fekete – guitar
 Kevin Williams- bass, keyboard
 Tyler Schwarz – drums
 Michael McCleary – cornet, trombone
 Surfer Blood –  producers
 Mark Chalecki – mastering
 Brian Rosemeyer – engineer
 Rob Schnapf – mixing
 Ray Holzknecht – drum engineering
 Julia Pitts – cover art
 Heidi Vaughan-Greenwood – layout

Charting

References

2015 albums
Surfer Blood albums
Joyful Noise Recordings albums